The Doll of Luna Park is a 1925 German silent drama film directed by Jaap Speyer and starring Alice Hechy, Walter Rilla, and Fritz Rasp.

The film's sets were designed by Franz Schroedter.

Cast

References

Bibliography

External links

1925 films
Films of the Weimar Republic
Films directed by Jaap Speyer
German silent feature films
1925 drama films
German drama films
German black-and-white films
Silent drama films
1920s German films
1920s German-language films